Prosser High School is a school in Prosser, Washington.  It is the main high school in the Prosser School District, though there is also an alternative Prosser Falls Education Center.  The school has around 920 students attending in grades 9 through 12.  The mascot is the Mustang and the school colors are red and white.

Proposed new campus
The school district has been trying to build a new, larger high school to replace the existing campus, which was built in 1936.  The current campus is overcrowded and run-down, with about 900 students attending a facility built for 500 students. District officials have held bond elections three times so far, once in 2005 and again in February and April 2011, in an attempt to get voter approval of a new school. In February 2017, another election was held and the bond passed with a 73% vote yes. Construction on the new high school began in May 2019 and was finished in 2021.

Notable alumni
Kellen Moore, former NFL quarterback, current Dallas Cowboys Offensive coordinator. Holds NCAA Division I record for wins as a starting quarterback at 50.

References

External links
Prosser School District
OSPI school report card 2012-2013

High schools in Benton County, Washington
Prosser, Washington
Public high schools in Washington (state)